Military Medical Academy may refer to:
 Military Medical Academy (Bulgaria), in Sofia
 Military Medical Academy (Serbia), in Belgrade
 Gülhane Military Medical Academy, in Ankara
 S.M. Kirov Military Medical Academy, in St. Petersburg